Henry Merley (died c. 1415) was the member of Parliament for the constituency of Dover for the parliaments of 1406 and 1407.

References 

Members of the Parliament of England for Dover
English MPs 1406
Year of birth unknown
1410s deaths
Year of death uncertain
English MPs 1407